Łukasz Uszalewski (born 27 April 1988 in Gdańsk) is a Polish centre back who plays for Elana Toruń.

Career

Club
In February 2011, he moved to Flota Świnoujście.

References

External links 
 
 

1988 births
Living people
Polish footballers
Association football defenders
MKS Cracovia (football) players
Elana Toruń players
GKS Katowice players
Flota Świnoujście players
Sportspeople from Gdańsk